The Wanaque Borough Schools is a community public school district that serves students in pre-kindergarten through eighth grade from Wanaque, in Passaic County, New Jersey, United States.

As of the 2018–19 school year, the district, comprising two schools, had an enrollment of 901 students and 92.1 classroom teachers (on an FTE basis), for a student–teacher ratio of 9.8:1.

The district is classified by the New Jersey Department of Education as being in District Factor Group "DE", the fifth-highest of eight groupings. District Factor Groups organize districts statewide to allow comparison by common socioeconomic characteristics of the local districts. From lowest socioeconomic status to highest, the categories are A, B, CD, DE, FG, GH, I and J.

Students in public school for ninth through twelfth grades attend Lakeland Regional High School, which serves students from the Boroughs of Ringwood and Wanaque. The high school is located in Wanaque and is part of the Lakeland Regional High School District. As of the 2018–19 school year, the high school had an enrollment of 930 students and 86.5 classroom teachers (on an FTE basis), for a student–teacher ratio of 10.8:1.

Schools
Schools in the district (with 2018–19 enrollment data from the National Center for Education Statistics) are:
Elementary schools
Haskell Elementary School 394 students in grades PreK–8
Kenneth Doolittle, Principal
Wanaque Elementary School 497 students in grades PreK–8
Charles Frick, Principal

Administration
Core members of the district's administration are:
Robert Mooney, Superintendent
Nancy DiBartolo, Business Administrator / Board Secretary

Board of education
The district's board of education, with nine members, sets policy and oversees the fiscal and educational operation of the district through its administration. As a Type II school district, the board's trustees are elected directly by voters to serve three-year terms of office on a staggered basis, with three seats up for election each year held (since 2012) as part of the November general election.

References

External links
Wanaque Borough Schools

School Data for the Wanaque Borough Schools, National Center for Education Statistics
Lakeland Regional High School

Wanaque, New Jersey
New Jersey District Factor Group DE
School districts in Passaic County, New Jersey